Max Miers (6 October 1940 – 19 January 2003) was an Australian rules footballer who played with Carlton for one season and with Fitzroy for three seasons in the Victorian Football League (VFL).

Football

Fitzroy (VFL)
On 6 July 1963, playing as resting forward-pocket ruckman, and kicking one goal, he was a member of the young and inexperienced Fitzroy team that comprehensively and unexpectedly defeated Geelong, 9.13 (67) to 3.13 (31) in the 1963 Miracle Match.

See also
 1963 Miracle Match

Notes

References

External links 

Max Mier's profile at Blueseum

1940 births
2003 deaths
Carlton Football Club players
Fitzroy Football Club players
Australian rules footballers from Victoria (Australia)